Equetus is a genus of drumfishes found in the middle western Atlantic Ocean and the Caribbean.

Behavior

Members of this genus are frequently observed during the day under ledges or near the opening of small caves, at depths between 1 and 30 meters, where they swim in repetitive patterns. They leave the protection of the daytime shelter at night to feed.

Diet

When juvenile, drums feed on plankton and small organisms. Adults feed at night on invertebrates like crabs and shrimp.

Global distribution

They live in the west central Atlantic and the Caribbean, including the Gulf of Mexico and the coasts of Florida and the Bahamas.

Species
Equetus lanceolatus, Jack-knifefish
Equetus punctatus, Spotted drum

Sciaenidae